The Colorado Mammoth are a lacrosse team based in Denver, Colorado playing in the National Lacrosse League (NLL). The 2018 season is the 32nd in franchise history and 16th as the Mammoth (previously the Washington Power, Pittsburgh Crossefire, and Baltimore Thunder).

Final standings

Game log

Regular season

Playoffs

Roster

Entry Draft
The 2017 NLL Entry Draft took place on September 18, 2017. The Mammoth made the following selections:

See also
2018 NLL season

References

Colorado
Colorado Mammoth seasons
Colorado Mammoth